William G. "Bill" Herbkersman (born June 30, 1958) is an American politician. He has been a member of the South Carolina House of Representatives from the 118th District since 2002. He is a member of the Republican party. He has lived and raised his children in Bluffton. Herbkersman attended the University of South Carolina and the Jefferson Institute. He is a member of numerous organizations both local and national.

References

Living people
1958 births
Republican Party members of the South Carolina House of Representatives
21st-century American politicians